Phaisali is a district (amphoe) in the eastern part of Nakhon Sawan province, Thailand.

History
Phaisali is an ancient city, as proven by Khmer remains in Tambon Samrong Chai. There were also prehistoric burial sites found in Tambon Pho Prasat and Na Khom, contemporary with the famous Ban Chiang.

The district was created as a minor district (king amphoe) on 1 January 1962, with the three tambons Samrong Chai, Khok Duea, and Takhro from Tha Tako district. It was upgraded to a full district on 27 July 1965.

Geography
Neighboring districts are (from the north clockwise): Nong Bua of Nakhon Sawan Province; Bueng Sam Phan and Wichian Buri of Phetchabun province; Khok Charoen, and Nong Muang of Lopburi province; and Tak Fa and Tha Tako of Nakhon Sawan.

Administration
The district is divided into eight sub-districts (tambons), which are further subdivided into 101 villages (mubans). Phaisali is a township (thesaban tambon) covering parts of tambons Phaisali and Khok Duea. There are a further eight tambon administrative organizations (TAO).

References

External links
amphoe.com

Phaisali